The Clue of the Hissing Serpent is Volume 53 in the original The Hardy Boys Mystery Stories published by Grosset & Dunlap.

This book was written for the Stratemeyer Syndicate by Andrew E. Svenson in 1974.

Plot summary
The Hardy brothers and Chet meet a wealthy balloonist named Albert Krassner, who is in possession of the Ruby King, a valuable life-sized chess piece that is the prize for a chess tournament. The boys soon learn that a gang wants to steal the Ruby King. Then the Ruby King mysteriously disappears from the Krassner safe, sending the Hardy Boys to Hong Kong. There they capture the gang and find the Ruby King.

References

The Hardy Boys books
1974 American novels
1974 children's books
Novels set in Hong Kong
Grosset & Dunlap books